Jalan Kompleks CIQ Bukit Bunga, Federal Route 480 is an institutional facilities federal road in Kelantan, Malaysia. It is a main route to Bukit Bunga Checkpoint and Ban Buketa, Thailand.

At most sections, the Federal Route 480 was built under the JKR R5 road standard, allowing maximum speed limit of up to 90 km/h.

List of junctions and towns

References

Malaysian Federal Roads
Roads in Kelantan